The Karacaahmet Cemetery is a 700-year-old historic cemetery, located in Üsküdar, the Asian side of Istanbul.

The cemetery was named after a warrior companion of Orhan I, the second Ottoman sultan and is believed to have been founded in the mid-14th century. Karacaahmet Cemetery, which hosts many bird species, looks like a forest with trees such as cypress, plane tree, oak, laurel, hackberry, and various other plants. The burial ground is covered by high cypress trees.

As a 700-year-old burial ground of historical importance, Karacaahmet Cemetery was declared a natural protected area and national historical landmark site in 1991, in accordance with the decision of the Istanbul Cultural and Natural Heritage Preservation Board. According to this decision, the cemetery area can only be used for burial of the dead, the cemetery cannot be removed or used as a park area in any way.

Karacaahmet Cemetery comprises 12 parcels, each dedicated to different religious groups. Many historical headstones can still be seen with inscriptions written in the Ottoman Turkish alphabet, a version of the Arabic alphabet. The total number of burials is not known precisely, because no records were kept in the past, but it is estimated in millions. Because the burial registers of the Istanbul Cemeteries Directorate started to be kept only after 1937.

The shrine of Karaca Ahmet Sultan, a 13th-century physician and saint of Bektashis, a tariqah of Islam, is situated within the cemetery. There are also many other historical tombs and masjids, which is the Arabic word for mosques, built during the Ottoman period.

General information and history
The cemetery, which began to expand in parallel with the increase in the Turkish population during the reign of Sultan Murad I, expanded further after the conquest of Istanbul in 1453. Karacaahmet was officially turned into a cemetery in 1582 by the mother of Murad III and Selim II's wife, Nurbanu Sultan,who donated 124 hectares of land from her own property for a city cemetery and ordered the cypress trees to be planted there. In addition, she appointed 13 guards for the preservation of these cypress trees and 24 people as gravediggers for the burial of dead.

The name of the cemetery, which was first mentioned in official sources as the cemetery of Karacaahmet Sultan in 1698, is also "Usküdar Mekabir-i Muslimini".

This cemetery, which was originally an empty, vast and clean ground, has always been a favorite place for the people of Istanbul for centuries and has served as a burial ground without interruption since its foundation.

The famous English poet Lord Byron included Üsküdar and the Karacaahmet cemetery in the following lines: «O Scutari! Your white houses look at thousands of graves, and above these graves rises that evergreen tree, that tender and dark cypress, inscribed in the foliage of eternal sorrow, like unrequited love».
The cemetery has fascinated foreign travelers for centuries with its impressive view and architectural splendor, and many travelers have mentioned this cemetery in their memoirs. The French poet and writer Theophile Gautier, who was one of the first to describe the cemetery in his memoir, expressed his admiration, saying that Karacaahmet is the largest cemetery in the East. In addition, the Polish Count Edward Raczyński in 1814 in his book “Journey to Istanbul and Canakkale” and the German Generalfeldmarschall Helmuth Karl Bernhard von Moltke in his book “Letters from Turkey” gave a large place to the Karacaahmet cemetery. Calculating that the underground population of Karacaahmet far exceeds the living population of Istanbul, Marshal Moltke said in 1836: "You can build a big city out of these gravestones."

The famous Danish writer and master of fairy tales, Hans Christian Andersen, who was impressed by its size during his visit to Istanbul in 1841, just 5 years after Moltke, described the Karacaahmet cemetery, as if confirming Moltke: “The area of this cemetery is so vast that if sow wheat, it would feed the whole city, and if all the local tombstones were used, then a new wall could be built that would surround Istanbul."

As if in unanimous agreement, Western travelers and writers have argued that the cemetery does not receive much sunlight, because it is covered with cypresses, and looks like a forest in dark greenery. This is one of the rare cemeteries for which poetry has been written in history.

The oldest photographs of the cemetery were taken by Ernest de Caranza in 1852–1854, followed by the brothers Abdullah, Bergren and Photo Sabah. The Anglican clergyman Robert Walsh, who had been the personal chaplain to the British ambassador Lord Strangford in Istanbul since 1820, compared the place to a large forest divided by wide roads on sloping ground. The scene he depicts was engraved by the English artist Thomas Allom.

The excavation works in the tunnel for the Marmaray project caused little damage as by June 2007, a dent of 1.5 m diameter and 4 m depth occurred close to the cemetery wall. It was reported that some graves were damaged.

Gallery

Notable burials
List is sorted in order of the year of death.
Historical
 Sheikh Hamdullah (1436–1520), calligrapher
 Mere Hüseyin Pasha (?–1624), Grand Vizier of the Ottoman Empire in 1620s
 Hafız Ahmed Pasha (1564–1632), Grand Vizier of the Ottoman Empire
 Hafız Post (1630–1694), composer
 Yusuf Nabi (1642–1717), Divan poet of Kurdish descent
 Nedîm (1681–1730), one of the most celebrated Ottoman poets
 Halil Hamid Pasha (1736–1785), Grand Vizier of the Ottoman Empire
 Benderli Ali Pasha (? – 1821), Sultan Mahmud II's Grand Vizier
 Jamaluddin al-Kumuki (1788–1869), a Naqshbandi tariqa shaykh and relative of Imam Shamil
 Haji Qadir Koyi (1817–1897), Kurdish poet
 Mehmed Rauf Pasha bin Abdi Pasha (1832–1908), Ottoman Serasker and Vali

1940s
 Kaçı Vehip Pasha (1877–1940), Ottoman general
 Ali bey Huseynzade (1864–1940), Azerbaijani writer, thinker, philosopher, artist and doctor, and was the creator of the modern Flag of Azerbaijan.
1950s
 Mehmet Esat Bülkat  (1862–1952), Ottoman general and Senior commander of the Gallipoli Campaign
 Reşat Nuri Güntekin (1889–1956), novelist
 Cafer Tayyar Eğilmez (1877–1958), an officer of the Ottoman Army and a general of the Turkish Army
 Osman Zeki Üngör (1880–1958), composer, initial conductor of the Presidential Symphony Orchestra, general
 Süleyman Hilmi Tunahan an influential Islamic scholar and Naqshbandi master, whose supposed followers are referred to as Süleymancılar
1960s
 Safiye Erol (1902–1964), female novelist
 Fikret Mualla Saygı (1903–1967), painter
1970s
 Nejdet Sançar (1910–1975), nationalist writer and ideologue
 Nihal Atsız (1905–1975), nationalist writer, ideologue, novelist, poet and philosopher
1980s
 Burhan Felek (1889–1982), journalist
 Oktay Rifat Horozcu (1914–1988), poet
 Ömer Boncuk (1917–1988), footballer and high school teacher
1990s
 Hamiyet Yüceses (1915–1996), female singer of Ottoman classical music
2000s
 Cem Karaca (1945–2004), rock musician
 Nezihe Viranyalı (1925–2004), female aviator
 Arif Mardin (1932–2006), Turkish-American music producer
 Nükhet Ruacan (1951–2007) female jazz singer 
 Mustafa Şekip Birgöl (1903–2008), retired colonel and the last veteran of the Turkish War of Independence
 Saadet İkesus Altan (1916–2007), female opera singer, vocal coach and opera director,
 Fazıl Hüsnü Dağlarca (1914–2008), poet
 Gazanfer Özcan(1931–2009), actor
2010s
 Verda Ün (1919–2011), female classical pianist
 Esin Afşar (1936–2011), singer and stage actress
 Sait Maden (1931–2013), translator, poet, painter and graphic designer
 Muzaffer Tekin (1950–2015), captain, veteran of the Cyprus Operation
 Oktay Sinanoğlu (1935–2015), theoretical chemist
 Tahsin Şahinkaya (1925–2015), Air Force general and one of the five leaders of the 1980 military coup
 Halit Akçatepe (1939–2017), actor
 İbrahim Erkal (1966–2017), singer and songwriter
 Can Bartu (1936–2019), basketball player, footballer and columnist,
 Süleyman Turan (1936–2019), stage and film actor,
 Yaşar Büyükanıt (1940–2019), former Chief General Staff of the Turkish Armed Forces,

See also 
 Şakirin Mosque
 List of cemeteries in Turkey

References

Cemeteries in Istanbul
Sunni cemeteries
Shia cemeteries
Üsküdar
Muslim cemeteries